Brandsby-cum-Stearsby is a civil parish in the Hambleton district of North Yorkshire, England, with a population of 234 (2001 census), increasing to 383 at the 2011 Census and including Dalby-cum-Skewsby and Yearsley.  It includes the villages of Brandsby (which has a separate article) and Stearsby.

There are five scheduled ancient monuments in the parish, all round barrows:
 Round barrow 300m south of Barhouse Farm at 
 Round barrow 450m north-east of Hagg Farm 
 Round barrow 300m east of Warren House 
 Round barrow 150m south of Warren House 
 Round barrow 300m west of Quarry House

References

Civil parishes in North Yorkshire